Lachi may refer to:

Lachi (artist), American EDM/pop singer and songwriter
Lachi language, a Kra language of northern Vietnam
Lachi people, an officially recognized ethnic group of Vietnam
Lachi River, Maunabo, Puerto Rico
Lachi Tehsil, in the Kohat District of Khyber Pakhtunkhwa, Pakistan
Lachi (Rural), an administrative unit in the tehsil
Lachi (Urban), an administrative unit in the tehsil

See also
Lachhi, a 1949 Punjabi film